Bodens IK is a defunct ice hockey team based in Boden, Sweden. Founded in 1987 out of the Bodens BK ice hockey section, the team operated within HockeyAllsvenskan. During the 1993–1994 season, the club was one penalty shot away from Elitserien against AIK and during the 1994–1995 season the club was one victory away from Elitserien. Also, the club played Kvalserien in 2002.

The club went into bankruptcy on 1 December 2005.

References

External links
Bodens IK profile at EliteProspects

Defunct ice hockey teams in Sweden
Sport in Boden, Sweden
Ice hockey clubs established in 1987
Sports clubs disestablished in 2005
1987 establishments in Sweden
2005 disestablishments in Sweden